This article refers to one of the former prefectures of Chad. From 2002 the country was divided into 18 regions.

Logone Occidental was one of the 14 prefectures of Chad. Located in the southwest of the country, Logone Occidental covered an area of 8,695 square kilometers and had a population of 455,489 in 1993. Its capital was Moundou.

References

Prefectures of Chad